Woodcock is a borough in Crawford County, Pennsylvania, United States. The population was 139 at the 2020 census, down from 157 at the 2010 census.

Geography
Woodcock is located in north-central Crawford County at  (41.754726, -80.084569). It is bordered to the west, south, and east by Woodcock Township and to the north by Cambridge Township.

Pennsylvania Route 86 passes through the borough, leading northeast  to Cambridge Springs and southwest  to Meadville, the county seat.

Demographics

As of the census of 2000, there were 146 people, 55 households, and 44 families residing in the borough. The population density was 260.2 people per square mile (100.7/km²). There were 57 housing units at an average density of 101.6 per square mile (39.3/km²). The racial makeup of the borough was 97.95% White, 2.05% from other races.

There were 55 households, out of which 36.4% had children under the age of 18 living with them, 69.1% were married couples living together, 7.3% had a female householder with no husband present, and 20.0% were non-families. 14.5% of all households were made up of individuals, and 3.6% had someone living alone who was 65 years of age or older. The average household size was 2.65 and the average family size was 2.93.

In the borough the population was spread out, with 20.5% under the age of 18, 8.2% from 18 to 24, 36.3% from 25 to 44, 29.5% from 45 to 64, and 5.5% who were 65 years of age or older. The median age was 38 years. For every 100 females there were 87.2 males. For every 100 females age 18 and over, there were 90.2 males.

The median income for a household in the borough was $50,500, and the median income for a family was $56,250. Males had a median income of $31,667 versus $32,250 for females. The per capita income for the borough was $19,577. There were none of the families and 2.6% of the population living below the poverty line, including no under eighteens and none of those over 64.

References

Populated places established in 1844
Boroughs in Crawford County, Pennsylvania